The Central constituency (No.55) is a Russian legislative constituency in Krasnoyarsk Krai. Until 2007 the constituency covered central Krasnoyarsk as well as exclave city Norilsk, however, in 2015 it expanded into Krasnoyarsk suburbs, grabbing territory from Krasnoyarsk and Achinsk constituencies.

Members elected

Election results

1993

|-
! colspan=2 style="background-color:#E9E9E9;text-align:left;vertical-align:top;" |Candidate
! style="background-color:#E9E9E9;text-align:left;vertical-align:top;" |Party
! style="background-color:#E9E9E9;text-align:right;" |Votes
! style="background-color:#E9E9E9;text-align:right;" |%
|-
|style="background-color:"|
|align=left|Valery Kolmakov
|align=left|Independent
|
|17.58%
|-
|style="background-color:"|
|align=left|Vladimir Ivanov
|align=left|Liberal Democratic Party
| -
|14.49%
|-
| colspan="5" style="background-color:#E9E9E9;"|
|- style="font-weight:bold"
| colspan="3" style="text-align:left;" | Total
| 
| 100%
|-
| colspan="5" style="background-color:#E9E9E9;"|
|- style="font-weight:bold"
| colspan="4" |Source:
|
|}

1995

|-
! colspan=2 style="background-color:#E9E9E9;text-align:left;vertical-align:top;" |Candidate
! style="background-color:#E9E9E9;text-align:left;vertical-align:top;" |Party
! style="background-color:#E9E9E9;text-align:right;" |Votes
! style="background-color:#E9E9E9;text-align:right;" |%
|-
|style="background-color:"|
|align=left|Nellya Zhukova
|align=left|Independent
|
|35.30%
|-
|style="background-color:"|
|align=left|Viktor Sitnov
|align=left|Independent
|
|21.80%
|-
|style="background-color:"|
|align=left|Raisa Karmazina
|align=left|Our Home – Russia
|
|10.36%
|-
|style="background-color:#959698"|
|align=left|Oleg Pashchenko
|align=left|Derzhava
|
|5.31%
|-
|style="background-color:"|
|align=left|Yevgeny Strigin
|align=left|Independent
|
|5.16%
|-
|style="background-color:"|
|align=left|Larisa Nechayeva
|align=left|Liberal Democratic Party
|
|4.90%
|-
|style="background-color:"|
|align=left|Oleg Nifantyev
|align=left|Independent
|
|3.13%
|-
|style="background-color:#2C299A"|
|align=left|Valery Lukinykh
|align=left|Congress of Russian Communities
|
|2.17%
|-
|style="background-color:"|
|align=left|Vera Avdeyeva
|align=left|Independent
|
|2.02%
|-
|style="background-color:"|
|align=left|Vladimir Minin
|align=left|Independent
|
|0.41%
|-
|style="background-color:#000000"|
|colspan=2 |against all
|
|8.46%
|-
| colspan="5" style="background-color:#E9E9E9;"|
|- style="font-weight:bold"
| colspan="3" style="text-align:left;" | Total
| 
| 100%
|-
| colspan="5" style="background-color:#E9E9E9;"|
|- style="font-weight:bold"
| colspan="4" |Source:
|
|}

1999

|-
! colspan=2 style="background-color:#E9E9E9;text-align:left;vertical-align:top;" |Candidate
! style="background-color:#E9E9E9;text-align:left;vertical-align:top;" |Party
! style="background-color:#E9E9E9;text-align:right;" |Votes
! style="background-color:#E9E9E9;text-align:right;" |%
|-
|style="background-color:"|
|align=left|Aleksandr Klyukin
|align=left|Independent
|
|24.89%
|-
|style="background-color:"|
|align=left|Veniamin Sokolov
|align=left|Independent
|
|15.33%
|-
|style="background-color:"|
|align=left|Andrey Yavisya
|align=left|Independent
|
|8.43%
|-
|style="background-color:"|
|align=left|Valery Kirilets
|align=left|Yabloko
|
|6.78%
|-
|style="background-color:"|
|align=left|Nellya Zhukova (incumbent)
|align=left|Independent
|
|5.74%
|-
|style="background-color:"|
|align=left|Nikolay Rybkin
|align=left|Independent
|
|5.14%
|-
|style="background-color:"|
|align=left|Nadezhda Safonova
|align=left|Independent
|
|4.23%
|-
|style="background-color:"|
|align=left|Albert Zhukov
|align=left|Independent
|
|3.47%
|-
|style="background-color:"|
|align=left|Vladimir Rachin
|align=left|Russian All-People's Union
|
|1.11%
|-
|style="background-color:"|
|align=left|Aleksandr Kashin
|align=left|Independent
|
|0.81%
|-
|style="background-color:#020266"|
|align=left|Boris Turutin
|align=left|Russian Socialist Party
|
|0.80%
|-
|style="background-color:#000000"|
|colspan=2 |against all
|
|21.58%
|-
| colspan="5" style="background-color:#E9E9E9;"|
|- style="font-weight:bold"
| colspan="3" style="text-align:left;" | Total
| 
| 100%
|-
| colspan="5" style="background-color:#E9E9E9;"|
|- style="font-weight:bold"
| colspan="4" |Source:
|
|}

2003

|-
! colspan=2 style="background-color:#E9E9E9;text-align:left;vertical-align:top;" |Candidate
! style="background-color:#E9E9E9;text-align:left;vertical-align:top;" |Party
! style="background-color:#E9E9E9;text-align:right;" |Votes
! style="background-color:#E9E9E9;text-align:right;" |%
|-
|style="background-color:"|
|align=left|Raisa Karmazina
|align=left|United Russia
|
|45.21%
|-
|style="background-color:"|
|align=left|Nikolay Smyk
|align=left|Communist Party
|
|9.90%
|-
|style="background-color:#00A1FF"|
|align=left|Natalya Sysoyeva
|align=left|Party of Russia's Rebirth-Russian Party of Life
|
|8.99%
|-
|style="background-color:"|
|align=left|Valentin Danilov
|align=left|Independent
|
|6.42%
|-
|style="background-color:"|
|align=left|Oleg Koledov
|align=left|Liberal Democratic Party
|
|5.08%
|-
|style="background-color:#000000"|
|colspan=2 |against all
|
|22.75%
|-
| colspan="5" style="background-color:#E9E9E9;"|
|- style="font-weight:bold"
| colspan="3" style="text-align:left;" | Total
| 
| 100%
|-
| colspan="5" style="background-color:#E9E9E9;"|
|- style="font-weight:bold"
| colspan="4" |Source:
|
|}

2016

|-
! colspan=2 style="background-color:#E9E9E9;text-align:left;vertical-align:top;" |Candidate
! style="background-color:#E9E9E9;text-align:left;vertical-align:top;" |Party
! style="background-color:#E9E9E9;text-align:right;" |Votes
! style="background-color:#E9E9E9;text-align:right;" |%
|-
|style="background-color: " |
|align=left|Pyotr Pimashkov
|align=left|United Russia
|
|40.78%
|-
|style="background-color:"|
|align=left|Aleksandr Gliskov
|align=left|Liberal Democratic Party
|
|18.36%
|-
|style="background-color:"|
|align=left|Ivan Serebryakov
|align=left|Patriots of Russia
|
|11.63%
|-
|style="background-color:"|
|align=left|Pyotr Vychuzhanin
|align=left|Communist Party
|
|10.00%
|-
|style="background-color:"|
|align=left|Maksim Markert
|align=left|A Just Russia
|
|4.23%
|-
|style="background-color:"|
|align=left|Natalia Podolyak
|align=left|The Greens
|
|3.25%
|-
|style="background:"| 
|align=left|Anton Gurov
|align=left|Communists of Russia
|
|3.15%
|-
|style="background-color: "|
|align=left|Yevgeny Baburin
|align=left|People's Freedom Party
|
|2.04%
|-
|style="background-color: "|
|align=left|Anatoly Urdayev
|align=left|Rodina
|
|1.72%
|-
| colspan="5" style="background-color:#E9E9E9;"|
|- style="font-weight:bold"
| colspan="3" style="text-align:left;" | Total
| 
| 100%
|-
| colspan="5" style="background-color:#E9E9E9;"|
|- style="font-weight:bold"
| colspan="4" |Source:
|
|}

2021

|-
! colspan=2 style="background-color:#E9E9E9;text-align:left;vertical-align:top;" |Candidate
! style="background-color:#E9E9E9;text-align:left;vertical-align:top;" |Party
! style="background-color:#E9E9E9;text-align:right;" |Votes
! style="background-color:#E9E9E9;text-align:right;" |%
|-
|style="background-color: " |
|align=left|Aleksandr Drozdov
|align=left|United Russia
|
|29.21%
|-
|style="background-color:"|
|align=left|Vasily Yermakov
|align=left|Communist Party
|
|17.81%
|-
|style="background-color: " |
|align=left|Denis Terekhov
|align=left|New People
|
|12.65%
|-
|style="background-color:"|
|align=left|Mikhail Trebin
|align=left|The Greens
|
|9.07%
|-
|style="background-color:"|
|align=left|Maksim Markert
|align=left|A Just Russia — For Truth
|
|8.64%
|-
|style="background:"| 
|align=left|Andrey Seleznyov
|align=left|Communists of Russia
|
|8.25%
|-
|style="background-color: "|
|align=left|Gennady Torgunakov
|align=left|Party of Pensioners
|
|5.74%
|-
|style="background-color: "|
|align=left|Maksim Bombakov
|align=left|Yabloko
|
|2.75%
|-
| colspan="5" style="background-color:#E9E9E9;"|
|- style="font-weight:bold"
| colspan="3" style="text-align:left;" | Total
| 
| 100%
|-
| colspan="5" style="background-color:#E9E9E9;"|
|- style="font-weight:bold"
| colspan="4" |Source:
|
|}

Notes

References

Russian legislative constituencies
Politics of Krasnoyarsk Krai